Labradford is the third studio album by American post-rock band Labradford. It was released on November 12, 1996, by Blast First and Kranky.

Track listing

Personnel
Adapted from the Labradford liner notes.

Labradford
 Carter Brown – keyboards
 Robert Donne – bass guitar
 Mark Nelson – vocals, guitar
Additional musicians
 Chris Johnston – violin

Production and additional personnel
 Mike Carosi – cover art
 Labradford – recording, mixing
 John Morand – recording, mixing

Release history

References

External links
 

1996 albums
Labradford albums
Blast First albums
Kranky albums